Jason Brown may refer to:
Jason Brown (American football) (born 1983), American football player turned farmer
Jason Brown (baseball) (born 1974), American baseball coach
Jason Brown (cricketer) (born 1974), English cricketer
Jason Brown (footballer) (born 1982), Welsh international football goalkeeper
Jason Brown (figure skater) (born 1994), American figure skater
Jason Brown (writer) (born 1969), American writer
Jason B. Brown (1839–1898), United States Representative from Indiana
Jason Derek Brown (born 1969), American fugitive
Jason "J" Brown (born 1976), English singer
Jason R. Brown (born 1970), American businessman
Jason Robert Brown (born 1970), American musical theater composer and lyricist
Colt Ford (born 1969), American musician who formerly golfed under the name Jason Brown
Jason Walter Brown (born 1938), American neurologist and writer